Georgios Afroudakis (born 17 October 1976) is a Greek water polo player. He played in five consecutive Summer Olympics for his native country from 1996 to 2012. He is, jointly with Croat Igor Hinić and Hungarian Tamás Kásás, the tenth athlete to compete in water polo at five Olympics.

See also
 Greece men's Olympic water polo team records and statistics
 List of athletes with the most appearances at Olympic Games
 List of players who have appeared in multiple men's Olympic water polo tournaments
 List of men's Olympic water polo tournament top goalscorers
 List of World Aquatics Championships medalists in water polo

References

External links
 

1976 births
Living people
Greek male water polo players
Olympiacos Water Polo Club players
Olympic water polo players of Greece
Panathinaikos Water Polo Club players
Water polo players at the 1996 Summer Olympics
Water polo players at the 2000 Summer Olympics
Water polo players at the 2004 Summer Olympics
Water polo players at the 2008 Summer Olympics
Water polo players at the 2012 Summer Olympics
World Aquatics Championships medalists in water polo
Water polo players from Athens
21st-century Greek people